Several vessels of the Royal Navy have been named HMS Monkey.

  was a gun-brig of 12 guns, built 1801 in Rochester and wrecked 25 December 1810 near Brittany.
  was a schooner assigned to the West Indies squadron, launched 1826 and wrecked in 1831 near Tampico.
  was the merchant schooner Courier, built 1827, and purchased in October 1831 at Bermuda and renamed Monkey. She remained in service as a tender to  until sold out in August 1833. 
  was a steam-powered paddle packet acquired from the Post Office in 1837 and converted to a tug in 1845. She was sold in 1887
  was a dockyard water tank vessel launched 21 December 1896 and assigned to Malta until sunk by German aircraft on 26 April 1942.

References

Royal Navy ship names